Lei Sufen (born June 5, 1979 in Nanning, Guangxi) is a female Chinese handball player who competed at the 2004 Summer Olympics.

In 2004, she finished eighth with the Chinese team in the women's competition. She played four matches and scored one goal.

External links
profile

1979 births
Living people
Handball players at the 2004 Summer Olympics
Olympic handball players of China
Chinese female handball players
People from Nanning
Sportspeople from Guangxi